Aspidosperma tomentosum is a timber tree native to Brazil, Bolivia, and Paraguay. It is common in of Cerrado vegetation in Brazil. It was first described by Carl Friedrich Philipp von Martius.

References

tomentosum
Trees of South America
Plants described in 1824